The Scindia Steam Navigation Company, founded in 1919, is the second oldest shipping company of India. The first being the Swadeshi Steam Navigation Company of VOC Pillai in today's Tamilnadu that was founded in 1906.

History

Foundation and early years
On 19 December 1914, the RMS Empress of India was reported sold to Scindia of Gwalior (also known as the Maharajah of Gwalior). The former Empress was re-fitted as a hospital ship for Indian troops. On 19 January 1915, the ship was renamed Loyalty. In March 1919, she was sold to the newly formed Scindia Steam Navigation Company Ltd; on 5 April 1919, navigation history was created when she journeyed to the United Kingdom, a crucial step for India's shipping history when sea routes were controlled by the British.

Expansion and competition
In 1932, the company purchased the Bengal Burma S.N. Co.; the company also purchased the Indian Co-operative Navigation & Trading Co., the Ratnagar S.N. Co., and in 1952 the Bombay S.N. Co. The company purchased shipyards in India in 1940, named Scindia Shipyard; its first ship, the 8000-ton Jalusha, was launched soon after independence by Jawaharlal Nehru in 1948.

Post war
The registered office is at Scindia Colony, Building III, Sir M.V. Road, Andheri (E), Mumbai-400069.

Flag
The house flag of Scindia is blue, with a white disc bearing a red swastika, an ancient Indian symbol unrelated to the its use by Nazi Germany.

Legacy
The National Maritime Day is celebrated in India on 5 April, the anniversary of the Loyalty's journey to the United Kingdom.

Locality
Scindia, Visakhapatnam

References

Further reading
The Scindia Steam Navigation Company Limited, Bombay, India 1919–1958. by Scindia Steam Navigation Company.

External links
 List of Ships owned by Scindia

Shipping companies of India
Companies based in Mumbai
Transport companies established in 1919
Maritime history of India
Walchand Group
Indian companies established in 1919